Ridin' Thunder is a 1925 American silent Western film directed by Clifford Smith and starring Jack Hoxie, Katherine Grant, and Francis Ford.

Plot
As described in a film magazine review, Frank Douglas creates a situation while shooting at a coyote that crosses his path, leading to his being accused and convicted of murdering a mysterious outlaw. His son Jack loves Jean, the daughter of the murdered outlaw. The tragedy of situations befalls the lovers, and then the real slayer is run down. Jack makes a desperate ride and saves his father from a shameful death. The way is paved for the lovers to marry.

Cast

References

Bibliography
 Langman, Larry. A Guide to Silent Westerns. Greenwood Publishing Group, 1992.

External links
 
 

1925 films
1925 Western (genre) films
American black-and-white films
Films directed by Clifford Smith
Universal Pictures films
Silent American Western (genre) films
1920s English-language films
1920s American films